Alva Edison Liles  (March 6, 1956 – January 7, 1998) was an American football defensive lineman who played one season in the National Football League with the Detroit Lions and Oakland Raiders. He played college football at Boise State University and attended Sacramento High School in Sacramento, California. Liles was also a member of the Oakland Invaders of the United States Football League. He was a member of the Oakland Raiders team that won Super Bowl XV.

External links
Just Sports Stats
Fanbase profile

1956 births
1998 deaths
Players of American football from Oklahoma
American football defensive linemen
African-American players of American football
Boise State Broncos football players
Detroit Lions players
Oakland Raiders players
Oakland Invaders players
Sportspeople from Oklahoma City
20th-century African-American sportspeople